is a passenger railway station in the city of Maebashi, Gunma Prefecture, Japan, operated by the private railway operator Jōmō Electric Railway Company.

Lines

Station layout
The station consists of a single island platform with a level crossing.

Platforms

Adjacent stations

History
Shinzō-Kekkan Center Station was opened as a signal stop named . It was elevated to a full passenger station named  on April 10, 1994 and renamed to its present name on June 1, 2001.

Surrounding area
Gunma Cardiovascular Center

See also
 List of railway stations in Japan

External links

  
	

Stations of Jōmō Electric Railway
Railway stations in Gunma Prefecture
Railway stations in Japan opened in 1994
Maebashi